The Charming Young Lady is a 1953 West German musical comedy film directed by Georg Thomalla and starring Thomalla, Herta Staal and Gisela Fackeldey. It is in the operetta film tradition and is based on the 1933 stage work of the same title by Ralph Benatzky. It was shot at the Spandau Studios in Berlin and on location in the city including around Wannsee. The film's sets were designed by the art director Rolf Zehetbauer.

Cast
 Georg Thomalla as Paul Norman
 Herta Staal as Annette
 Gisela Fackeldey as Rosette
 Wilfried Seyferth as Felix Bernard
 Irene Adam as Hanni, Schülerin von Felix
 Carin Bäumler as Lilo, Schülerin von Felix
 Hans Leibelt as Schokoladenkönig Braun
 Käte Pontow as Luise, seine Tochter
 Ingrid Rentsch as Eva, Schülerin von Felix
 Karl Schönböck as Hektor Kranz
 Petra Unkel as Julie, Hausmädchen
 Ursula von Manescul as Christa, Schülerin von Felix
 Ernst Waldow as Ministerialdirigent Hanau

References

Bibliography 
 Bock, Hans-Michael & Bergfelder, Tim. The Concise CineGraph. Encyclopedia of German Cinema. Berghahn Books, 2009.

External links 
 

1953 films
1953 musical comedy films
German musical comedy films
West German films
1950s German-language films
Operetta films
Films based on operettas
Constantin Film films
Films scored by Ralph Benatzky
German black-and-white films
1950s German films
Films shot at Spandau Studios
Films shot in Berlin